Slobodan Perović (6 May 1926 – 2 May 1978) was a Serbian actor. He appeared in more than seventy films from 1955 to 1978.

Selected filmography

References

External links 

1926 births
1978 deaths
Actors from Kragujevac
Serbian male film actors
Golden Arena winners